The European Congress of Ethnic Religions (ECER) is an organisation for cooperation among associations that promote the ethnic religions of Europe.
The primary goal of the ECER is the strengthening of pre-Christian religious traditions of Europe, emphasizing and fostering their ties with modern pagan movements.

History
A "World Pagan Congress" was hosted in June 1998 in Vilnius, Lithuania, organized by Jonas Trinkūnas of Romuva, a Lithuanian neopagan organization. It was attended by members from a number of neopagan organizations from Europe and North America, as well as observers from the academic field. At the meeting it was decided to make the congress an annual event and to form an organization around it.

The organization's name was the result of a day-long passionate debate. The words "pagan" and "heathen" were rejected because of their perceived cultural associations with immorality, violence and backwardness. The word "polytheistic" was also rejected as an oversimplification. "Indigenous" was seen as satisfactory on a linguistic level, but was voted down with regard to its established use by groups distinguished from European colonizers. Other suggestions were terms along the lines of "old religion" and "ancestral religion". "Ethnic", the Greek equivalent to the Latin paganus in early Christian sources, was eventually agreed on. The word's history and the connection to ethnology were things that appealed to the majority of the participants.

To avoid misunderstandings, the founding declaration of the organization makes clear that ethnic here does not refer to ethnic politics. The founding member Denis Dornoy also clarified this in the organization's newsletter The Oaks in 1999:

The congress was held under the name "World Congress of Ethnic Religions" from 1999 to 2010. The 2006 and 2009 conferences were held in India, in the spirit of  collaboration between Western Neopaganism and Hinduism. The intention of a worldwide scope was "more of a dream than reality", as the congress mostly consisted of representatives of neopagan movements in Europe. To reflect this, the organization was renamed "European Congress of Ethnic Religions" in 2010. The congress was an annual event until 2010, and has since then been held once every two years.

Members and leadership
ECER's website defines the scope of the organization: "By Ethnic Religion, we mean religion, spirituality, and cosmology that is firmly grounded in a particular people's traditions. In our view, this does not include modern occult or ariosophic theories/ideologies, nor syncretic neo-religions."

The current president of the organization is Andras Corban-Arthen.

Member organizations represent Baltic, Slavic, Germanic, Greek, and Roman traditions. As of 2014 the member organizations of ECER are:
Dávný obyčej, Czech Republic
 Dievturība, Latvia
Forn Siðr, The Aesir and Vanir faith community in Denmark, founding member
Lithuanian Baltic religion Romuva, founding member
Rodzima Wiara, Poland, founding member
Slovenski Staroverci, Slovenia
Society of the Ukrainian Native Faith “Pravoslavya” Kyiv, Ukraine
Supreme Council of Ethnikoi Hellenes (Ypato Symboulio Ellinon Ethnikon – YSEE), Greece, founding member
Movimento Tradizionale Romano, Italy
Societas Hesperiana Pro Culto Deorum, Italy
The Asatrufellowship, Denmark
Werkgroep Hagal, formerly Werkgroep Traditie, founding member, Belgium
Associazione Tradizionale Pietas, Italy
 
Former members:
 Foreningen Forn Sed, Norway  
 Germanische Glaubens Gemeinschaft, Germany
 Diipetes, Greece  
 Groupe Druidique des Gaules, France 
 Eldaring, Germany (2005-2009)
 Federazione Pagana, Italy
 Rodzima Wiara, Poland
 Ásatrúarfélagið, Iceland

Chronology of the congresses

References

Notes

Sources
Koenraad Elst. Return of the Swastika: Hate and Hysteria versus Hindu Sanity, 2015. 
Michael Strmiska, Modern Paganism in World Cultures: Comparative Perspectives, 2005

External links
ECER official website

Modern paganism in Europe
Modern pagan organizations based in Lithuania
Modern pagan organizations established in 1998
Interfaith organizations